Wankidi is a mandal headquarter in Komaram Bheem district of the Indian state of Telangana. It is located in of Komaram Bheem revenue division.

Geography 

References

External links 
Adilabad Mandals and Gram Panchayats

Villages in Komaram Bheem district
Mandals in Komaram Bheem district